Bank holidays in Scotland are determined under the Banking and Financial Dealings Act 1971 and the St Andrew's Day Bank Holiday (Scotland) Act 2007.  Unlike the rest of the United Kingdom, most bank holidays are not recognised as statutory public holidays in Scotland, as most public holidays are determined by local authorities across Scotland. Some of these may be taken in lieu of statutory holidays, while others may be additional holidays, although many companies, including the Royal Mail, do not follow all the holidays listed below; and many swap between English and local holidays. Many large shops and supermarkets continue to operate normally during public holidays, especially since there are no restrictions such as Sunday trading rules in Scotland.

Bank holidays
Since Easter 1996, the Scottish clearing banks have harmonised the days on which they are closed with those in England and Wales, and are therefore closed on Easter Monday and the last Monday in August (rather than the first). This has resulted in a number of local authorities creating a public holiday on Easter Monday. Previously Easter Monday had not been a public holiday in Scotland. There have been many protests about banks opening on 2 January since this decision was taken. This has resulted in many banks now providing only a limited service on 2 January, with most members of staff still entitled to the holiday.

Schedule 1 to the 1971 Act states that the following days are official bank holidays in Scotland:

Notes
 Certain bank branches in Edinburgh are open on the last Monday in August when the Edinburgh Festival is taking place
 When the stated date falls on a Saturday or Sunday, the following Monday is normally designated a public holiday instead. When Christmas Day falls on a Saturday (and thus Boxing Day on a Sunday), the following Monday and Tuesday are normally designated public holidays instead
 In 1995, the May Day holiday was moved to the second Monday in May – i.e., from 1 May to 8 May – to commemorate the 50th anniversary of VE Day
 In 1999, an additional bank holiday was given on 31 December to enable people to prepare for the festivities to mark the arrival of the year 2000
 In 2002, the Spring Holiday was moved to 4 June. This caused it to follow an extra bank holiday on 3 June, making a four-day weekend to celebrate the Golden Jubilee of Queen Elizabeth II
 In 2011, a public holiday was given on 29 April to ensure most people would have a chance to celebrate the Wedding of Prince William and Catherine Middleton, making a four-day weekend as May Day was on the following Monday
 In 2012 the Spring Holiday was moved to 4 June. It was then followed by an extra holiday on 5 June, making a four-day weekend to celebrate the Diamond Jubilee of Queen Elizabeth II. Unfortunately, only Fife, Inverclyde and Scottish Borders were affected as they already take the first Monday in June as a public holiday. Most areas in Scotland did not have the four-day weekend and only had the Tuesday official holiday.

The holiday on 1 January (or 2 January if 1 January is Sunday) is statutory. If New Year's Day is Saturday a substitute holiday is given on 4 January by royal proclamation. 2 January is given by royal proclamation, with a substitute holiday on 4 January if it is Saturday and 3 January if it is Sunday or Monday. 

The St Andrew's Day Bank Holiday (Scotland) Act 2007, passed by the Scottish Parliament on 29 November 2006, added St Andrew's Day (30 November), or the following Monday should 30 November fall on a weekend.

Special days and substitute bank holidays
Section 1 of the 1971 Act also provides that special days may be appointed as bank holidays (either additional or in place of bank holidays which fall on a Saturday or Sunday) subject to royal proclamation each year. These include Boxing Day, which has been an additional bank holiday in Scotland since 1974, and the last Monday in May, which has been a bank holiday since 1978.

Section 1 of the 1971 Act also enables substitute bank holidays to be appointed by royal proclamation. Substitute days are customarily appointed for all UK bank holidays which fall on a Saturday or Sunday. Where any of the dates fall on a Sunday, the Act substitutes the following Monday for that date. If any fall on a Saturday (or if Boxing Day falls on a Saturday or Sunday), the royal proclamation includes substitute days for these days.

Public holidays

Sources
Scottish Government article on St Andrew's Day Bank Holiday (Scotland) Act 2007

See also
 Bank holiday
 Public holidays in the United Kingdom

References

External links 
 

Holidays in Scotland
Scottish culture
Scotland